Harrold is a village, civil parish and electoral ward in the Borough of Bedford within Bedfordshire, England, around nine miles north-west of Bedford. The village is on the north bank of the River Great Ouse, close to the county boundaries of Buckinghamshire (Milton Keynes) and Northamptonshire (North Northamptonshire) and is the site of an ancient bridge, linking the village with Carlton with Chellington on the south bank. Immediately to the east of the village is Odell. Across the bridge is Carlton.

The buttermarket in Harrold has often been an iconic image in Harrold, along with the bridge. It also used to be the logo for one of the schools in Harrold. Harrold also has a village lock-up that was used to detain drunks and suspected criminals. It is no longer in use.

Harrold Primary Academy is a primary school located in the village.

The Church of St Peter is also located in the village.

History
Harrold was recorded in the Domesday Book of 1086 as a parish within the Hundred of Willey.

An early medieval sword mount was unearthed by a metal detectorist in 2006. It is believed the tiny phallic decoration could have adorned the sword belt of a high-ranking Saxon warrior.

There are two public houses in Harrold. The Muntjac and the Oakley Arms. Paul McCartney reputedly gave the first live performance of "Hey Jude" in the Oakley Arms in Harrold on 30 June 1968.

The village was struck by an F1/T2 tornado on 23 November 1981, as part of the record-breaking nationwide tornado outbreak on that day.

Electoral ward
Today an electoral ward within the Borough of Bedford, it contains four civil parishes within its boundaries. Civil parishes and settlements within the ward (from south to north) are Harrold CP, Odell parish, Podington CP including Hinwick and Farndish, and Wymington CP including Little Wymington. Harrold itself is near the southern boundary of its ward which follows some of the River Great Ouse. The ward extends northward from Harrold and fills the northwest corner of Bedfordshire, bordering Northamptonshire.

Twin towns
 Sainte-Pazanne, Loire-Atlantique

Notable people
 W. T. Godber (1904–1981), English agriculturalist; worked in Harrold.
 George Le Fevre (1848–1891), surgeon and politician in colonial Australia; born in Harrold.
 Leslie Prentice (1886–1928), Australian-born English cricketer; died in Harrold.
 Ashley Walker (1844–1927), English amateur cricketer; died in Harrold.

Gallery

See also
Harrold Hall

References

External links

Harrold Community Website
Harrold Parish Council
Bedfordshire Archives and Records on Harrold

Villages in Bedfordshire
Civil parishes in Bedfordshire
Borough of Bedford